Victor Peicov (born 16 October 1965) is a Moldovan wrestler. He competed in the men's freestyle 74 kg at the 1996 Summer Olympics.

References

1965 births
Living people
Moldovan male sport wrestlers
Olympic wrestlers of Moldova
Wrestlers at the 1996 Summer Olympics
Place of birth missing (living people)
World Wrestling Championships medalists
20th-century Moldovan people